Barnabás Sztipánovics (born 2 July 1974) is a Hungarian retired football player.

Career
In the 1998–99 season, he shared the place of the scorer leader of the Croatian First Football League with his teammate from Rijeka, Igor Musa, both scoring 14 goals.

While playing for Maribor, he scored the decisive goal in the last match of the 2000–01 Slovenian First League season against Olimpija Ljubljana in Ljubljana to secure the fifth league title for Maribor.

Honours
Maribor
Slovenian PrvaLiga: 2000–01, 2001–02

APOEL
Cypriot Super Cup: 2002

Nyiregyhaza Spartacus
Nemzeti Bajnokság II: 2006–07

References

External links

1974 births
Living people
Sportspeople from Baranya County
Hungarian footballers
Hungarian people of Croatian descent
Association football forwards
Zalaegerszegi TE players
NK Belišće players
HNK Rijeka players
NK Maribor players
APOEL FC players
Olympiakos Nicosia players
Pécsi MFC players
Nyíregyháza Spartacus FC players
Nemzeti Bajnokság II players
Nemzeti Bajnokság I players
First Football League (Croatia) players
Croatian Football League players
Slovenian PrvaLiga players
Cypriot First Division players
Expatriate footballers in Croatia
Hungarian expatriate sportspeople in Croatia
Expatriate footballers in Slovenia
Hungarian expatriate sportspeople in Slovenia
Expatriate footballers in Cyprus
Hungarian expatriate sportspeople in Cyprus
Expatriate footballers in Austria
Hungarian expatriate sportspeople in Austria
Hungarian expatriate footballers
Hungary international footballers